The Women's Club Nacional de Football is a club from Montevideo representing the Club Nacional de Football in the Uruguayan championship of women's football since the first edition organized in 1997, where the Club Nacional de Football obtained the first title.

Current squad

Honours
 Campeonato Uruguayo (4): 1997, 2000, 2010, 2011–12

References

External links
 

W
Women's football clubs in Uruguay